Governor Baker may refer to:

Charlie Baker (born 1956), 72nd Governor of Massachusetts
Conrad Baker (1817–1885), 15th Governor of Indiana
Horace Baker (1869–1941), Acting Governor of New Jersey, 1910–1911
Joshua Baker (1799–1885), 22nd Governor of Louisiana
Nathaniel B. Baker (1818–1876), 24th Governor of New Hampshire
Sam Aaron Baker (1874–1933), 36th Governor of Missouri